Bagong Pilipinas was a morning magazine show aired on PTV, which was aired from May 17, 2017, to July 31, 2020, replacing Good Morning Pilipinas and was replaced by Rise and Shine Pilipinas. the show airs from Monday to Friday at 7:00 AM. to 8:00 AM. (UTC +08) and Afternoon Edition from Mondays to Wednesday from 2:00 PM to 2:30 PM on PTV Channel 4. It was premiered on May 17, 2017.

Although Bagong Pilipinas is a then-new program, some of the segments from Good Morning Pilipinas were absorbed to the program.

On July 31, 2020, as part of PTV's programming revamp under the leadership of PTV Network General Manager, Kat de Castro, Bagong Pilipinas air their last broadcast to make way for Rise and Shine Pilipinas!

Final Hosts
Jules Guiang
Dianne Medina
Karla Paderna 
Diane Querrer
Alfonso "Fifi" Delos Santos
Chichi Atienza-Valdepenas
Karlo Nograles

Final Segment Hosts
Carby Salvador
Pamela Ablola
Jake Napoles
Josanna Zosimo
Dr. Emmylou Eclipse
Emman Franc

Final Former Hosts and Segment Hosts
Aljo Bendijo
Audrey Gorriceta
Greco Belgica
Congressman John Bertiz
Hans Horne
Ann Jun Magnaye
Bong Magpayo

Final Segments
Artsy Craftsy
ASEAN TV
Best Buys
Dermaesthetique
Eat's Fun
EntrePinoy
FAB: Fashion and Beauty
Fifi of Fortune
Fifirazzi
FriDates with Carby
Health is Wealth
It's A Sign
Juan Overseas
Just 4 Kids
Lifestyle
Live Performance
Lutong Bahay
News & Views
On The Spot (Interview Portion)
Passport on Wheels
Pop Culture
School Hopping
Special Feature
Teen Patrol
Traffic Update
Trip Ticket
WWW: Whatever, Whenever, Wherever (Features)

See also
List of programs aired by People's Television Network
Good Morning Pilipinas

References

People's Television Network original programming
Philippine television news shows
Breakfast television in the Philippines
Filipino-language television shows
2017 Philippine television series debuts
2020 Philippine television series endings
2020s Philippine television series